In the New York City government, each of the five boroughs has a borough board composed of the borough president, City Council members from the borough, and the chairperson of each community board in the borough. The borough boards can hold or conduct public or private hearings, adopt by-laws, prepare comprehensive and special purpose plans and make recommendations for land use and planning, mediate disputes and conflicts among two or more community boards, submit a comprehensive statement of the expense and capital budget priorities and needs, evaluate the progress of capital developments and the quality and quantity of services provided by agencies, and otherwise consider the needs of the borough.

See also
 Community boards of New York City
 Community boards of Manhattan
 Community boards of the Bronx
 Community boards of Brooklyn
 Community boards of Queens
 Community boards of Staten Island

References

External links
 BoardStat from BetaNYC
 Bronx Borough Board
 
 Brooklyn Borough Board
 
 Manhattan Borough Board
 
 Staten Island Borough Board
 

Government of New York City